Dečija pesma (English: Children’s Song) is the second EP by the Serbian alternative rock band Disciplina Kičme, released by the Serbian record label PGP RTB in 1987. The EP features five different versions of the song "Dečija pesma", children, disco, early, hit and superior mix of the track. The song lyrics featured the verse "Nije dobro Bijelo Dugme; Nije dobra Katarina; Šta je dobro; Šta nam treba; Kičme, Kičme Disciplina") ("Bijelo Dugme is not good; Neither is Katarina; What is good; What we need; Kičme, Kičme Disciplina"). As guests on the EP appeared YU grupa guitarist Dragi Jelić, Ivan Vdović "VD", Srđan Todorović, who by that time was playing in Ekatarina Velika, and Roze Poze guitarist Željko Nikolić. Ironic cover versions of Robert Palmer's "Addicted to Love" and The Cult single "Love Removal Machine", recorded live at the Akademija club, also appeared on the EP.

Track listing 
All tracks written by Zeleni Zub, except tracks 3, written by Ian Astbury and Billy Duffy, and 6, written by Robert Palmer.

Personnel

The band 
 Koja (Dušan Kojić) — bass, vocals, artwork by [cover], conversation [voice] (track 4)
 Kele (Nenad Krasovac) — drums (tracks 3, 6, 7)
 Dedža — trumpet (tracks 3, 6, 7)
 Zerkman (Zoran Erkman) — trumpet (tracks 1, 2, 3, 5, 6, 7)

Additional personnel 
 Zeleni Zub (Dušan Kojić) — music by, lyrics by, producer
 Žika (Srđan Todorović) — drums (tracks 1, 5)
 Zorica Batin-Đukanović — photography
 Šane (Dušan Petrović) — recorded by (tracks 1, 2, 4, 5), conversation [voice] (track 4)
 Đuka (Dušan Đukić) — drums [intro bass drum] (track 1)
 Borovnica — viola (track 1)
 Željko Nikolić — guitar [slide] (track 2)
 Vd (Ivan Vdović) — drum programming [Rx5 Yamaha], voice [conversation] (track 4)
 Dragi Jelić — guitar [solo] (track 5)
 Kuzma (Jurij Novoselić) — saxophone [alto] (track 5)
 Vlada Negovanović — recorded by (track 7)

References 
 EX YU ROCK enciklopedija 1960-2006, Janjatović Petar; 
 Dečija Pesma at Discogs

1987 EPs
PGP-RTB EPs
Disciplina Kičme albums